Theolic Smith (May 19, 1913 – November 3, 1981), nicknamed "Fireball", was an American Negro league pitcher in the 1930s and 1940s.

A native of Wabbaseka, Arkansas, Smith attended Vashon High School in St. Louis, Missouri. He made his Negro league debut in 1936 with the Pittsburgh Crawfords, and was named starting pitcher for the first 1939 East–West All-Star Game. Smith played for the San Diego Padres of the Pacific Coast League from 1952 to 1955. He died in Compton, California in 1981 at age 68.

References

External links
 and Seamheads
 Theolic Smith at Arkansas Baseball Encyclopedia

1913 births
1981 deaths
Cleveland Buckeyes players
St. Louis Stars (1939) players
Pittsburgh Crawfords players
Baseball pitchers
Baseball players from Arkansas
People from Jefferson County, Arkansas
20th-century African-American sportspeople